The fifth season of Prison Break (also known as Prison Break: Resurrection) is a limited event television series and a revival of the original series created by Paul Scheuring that aired on Fox from 2005 to 2009. The season is produced by 20th Century Fox Television in association with Adelstein Productions, Dawn Olmstead Productions, One Light Road Productions and Original Film. Paul Scheuring serves as showrunner, with himself, Marty Adelstein, Neal H. Moritz and Dawn Olmstead, Vaun Wilmott, Michael Horowitz  and Nelson McCormick serving as executive producers. McCormick also serves as director. The season premiered on April 4, 2017, and concluded on May 30, 2017, consisting of 9 episodes. 

Wentworth Miller and Dominic Purcell reprise their respective roles as Michael Scofield and Lincoln Burrows, while Sarah Wayne Callies, Amaury Nolasco, Paul Adelstein, Robert Knepper and Rockmond Dunbar also return from the original series. New cast additions include Mark Feuerstein, Inbar Lavi, Augustus Prew, Marina Benedict, Rick Yune and Steve Mouzakis. A pilot was ordered in August 2015 and the series was greenlit in January 2016. Production on the series began in April 2016 and filming took place in Vancouver and the Moroccan cities of Rabat, Casablanca, and Ouarzazate.

Premise
Seven years after his apparent death, Michael Scofield  resurfaces in the notorious Ogygia Prison in Sana'a, Yemen, under the name Kaniel Outis. As the country is engulfed by war, two of Michael's old friends, his brother Lincoln Burrows and fellow Fox River escapee Benjamin "C-Note" Franklin, risk their lives by traveling to Yemen to bring Michael home. Back in the United States, Michael's wife Sara, now remarried, is hunted by agents of an operative known as Poseidon, the one responsible for Michael's disappearance.

Cast

Main
 Wentworth Miller as Michael Scofield 
 Dominic Purcell as Lincoln Burrows
 Sarah Wayne Callies as Sara Scofield
 Paul Adelstein as Paul Kellerman
 Rockmond Dunbar as Benjamin Miles "C-Note" Franklin
 Robert Knepper as Theodore "T-Bag" Bagwell
 Amaury Nolasco as Fernando Sucre
 Mark Feuerstein as Jacob Anton Ness
 Inbar Lavi as Sheba
 Augustus Prew as David "Whip" Martin

Recurring
 Rick Yune as Ja
 Marina Benedict as Emily Blake / A&W
 Steve Mouzakis as Van Gogh
 Amin El Gamal as Cyclops
 Kunal Sharma as Sid
 Numan Acar as Abu Ramal
 Curtis Lum as Agent Henry Kishida
 Crystal Balint as Heather
 Waleed Zuaiter as Mohammad El-Tunis
 TJ Ramini as Cross
 Akin Gazi as Omar
 Duncan Ollerenshaw as Blue Hawaii
 Faran Tahir as Jamil
 Leo Rano as Luca Abruzzi
 Michael Benyaer as Zakat
 Bobby Naderi as Mustapha
 Christian Michael Cooper as Mike Scofield

Episodes

Production

Development 
On January 12, 2015, at the 2015 Winter TCA Press Tour, Wentworth Miller and Dominic Purcell revealed the possibility that Fox was interested in bringing back Prison Break, with Miller stating: "We actually floated the idea to Fox very casually and they seemed very not casual about this interest. They seemed to think there was something there." Purcell concluded by adding, "It's something that Fox is, as Wentworth said, potentially excited about."

On January 17, 2015, Fox Television Group chairman and CEO Gary Newman made it clear that they would love to bring Prison Break back for another run, although Fox had nothing to report. Newman himself stated, "There's some speculation in the press at Prison Break and we've made it clear at the studio that we'd bring Prison Break back at the studio [...] It's the perfect event series. But at the moment, we have nothing else to report."

On June 2, 2015, it was reported that a limited series revival of Paul Scheuring's Prison Break was in development at Fox.

On August 6, 2015, Fox confirmed a 10-episode order for the revival. The limited series is a sequel to the original series, taking place several years later, and features Miller and Purcell reprising their roles as well as the return of other original characters. Fox Television Group chairman and CEO Dana Walden herself stated that Prison Break has performed particularly well internationally and on SVOD platforms such as Netflix. Walden added that: "a logical and believable explanation to why the characters are alive and still moving around the world [...]" Walden said. "The brothers and some of the iconic characters will be back, and it will address some questions that were set up at the end of the series for a new audience."

On January 15, 2016, Fox officially ordered the revival to series, with the episode order revised to nine episodes, though Fox declined to announce how many episodes the series will run. The original producing team of creator Paul Scheuring, Neal Moritz, Marty Adelstein and Dawn Olmstead were all confirmed as to return for the event series as executive producers and Scheuring writing and serving as showrunner and Miller and Purcell being producers of the season. Luca Tranchino served as production designer.

Writing
On August 7, 2015, it was announced that creator and executive producer Paul Scheuring would be writing the first episode as well as a style/tone bible for other writers to follow.

Casting
On January 15, 2016, stars Wentworth Miller and Dominic Purcell were confirmed to be reprising their roles as brothers Michael Scofield and Lincoln Burrows.

On February 22, 2016, it was reported that Mark Feuerstein would play Scott Ness (later changed to Jacob Ness), the husband of Dr. Sara Tancredi, a Professor of Economics (game theory) at Cornell who has been described as, "dubious of the government but still has a bit of fight in him when it comes to taking them on." Additionally, on February 22, 2016, it was confirmed that Sarah Wayne Callies was in talks to reprise her role in the follow-up along with Robert Knepper, Rockmond Dunbar and Amaury Nolasco, although there were no deals in place with any of them at that time.

On March 9, 2016, Augustus Prew, Rick Yune and Steve Mouzakis were cast for "heavily recurring roles". Prew plays "funny, crazy and pretty damn sharp" Whip; Yune plays Ja, who is described as a "Korean identity thief, who disheveled appearance belies his genius"; and Mouzakis plays Van Gogh, "a bad-ass nut-job". On March 9, 2016, Sarah Wayne Callies was confirmed to be returning as Sara Tancredi. On March 16, 2016, Amin El Gamal was cast in a recurring role, playing Cyclops.

On March 17, 2016, it was announced that original stars Robert Knepper, Amaury Nolasco and Rockmond Dunbar would be reprising their respective roles as T-Bag, Sucre and C-Note, respectively. On March 21, 2016, Paul Adelstein was confirmed to be reprising his role as Paul Kellerman. On March 21, 2016, Inbar Lavi, Marina Benedict and Kunal Sharma were cast in major recurring roles. Lavi plays Sheba, an operator/fixer/activist who becomes involved with Burrows. Benedict is A&W, "a crazed and fearless villainess who is unconcerned about her physical well-being but ruthless and efficient in completing her deadly goals", and Sharma plays Sid, a man in prison. On April 22, 2016, it was announced that Faran Tahir would play Jamil, whom Tahir describes as "a man who has an inner conflict which again is something I love experimenting with."

In July 2016, it was revealed that William Fichtner would not be reprising his role as Alexander Mahone. Robert Knepper told Digital Spy that "[writer] Paul Scheuring loves Bill Fichtner and I love Bill Fichtner. He's a brilliant actor – but Paul honestly said to me, 'I don't know what to do with that character'. He didn't want to just bring everybody back, so that the audience go, 'Oh, look, it's Bill Fichtner again!' – he honestly thought, 'I'm not sure where to do that in the plot.' So if someday there's another chapter of this, maybe then Bill will be back. But I think the characters that are there, each of our moments that we have, are key to the storytelling, which is how it should be."

Filming
Production on the season began on April 7, 2016, in Vancouver, once Miller and Purcell completed filming for Legends of Tomorrow. Filming concluded in Vancouver on July 11, 2016. On June 1, 2016, Dominic Purcell was almost killed on set in Morocco, after an iron bar used as a set piece had fallen onto his head, which caused a broken nose and a head injury. Purcell was immediately airlifted from Marrakesh to Casablanca for treatment where he recovered. Filming of the series was not substantially disrupted due to the accident.

Music
Composer Ramin Djawadi stated that he would definitely like to return and work on the new season of Prison Break, after learning of the news of the possible revival, to which further stated, "I literally just heard it, so it's news for me. It's very exciting because the show was such a good show but nobody has contacted me at this point." Djawadi later added, "Most likely, if my schedule allows - that show was very close to me. I loved all the people involved. I thought it was an incredible show. Absolutely." In June 2016, it was confirmed that Djawadi would return as composer for season five.

Reception

Critical response
The revival season received a mixed response. On review aggregator Rotten Tomatoes, the season has an approval rating of 56% based on 34 reviews, with an average score of 6.14/10. The site's critical consensus reads, "Prison Break recaptures some of its old urgency in its return, but familiar faces and frenetic action aren't enough to make up for a plot that manages to bore while beggaring belief." On Metacritic, the season has a score of 48 out of 100, based on 18 critics, indicating "mixed or average reviews".

Ratings

Home media release
The event series was released on Blu-ray and DVD on June 27, 2017. Special features include a behind-the-scenes featurette, "A Return Home: The Making of Prison Break Event Series".

References

External links
 

Prison Break
Prison Break episodes
2017 American television seasons
Terrorism in television
Television shows set in Yemen